Andrej Glucks (born March 18, 1976 in Zagreb) is a Croatian slalom canoer who competed from the early 1990s to the early 2010s (decade). Competing in two Summer Olympics, he earned his best finish of 11th in the K-1 event in Sydney in 2000. Glucks also competed in slalom in eight World Championships and eight European Championships.

References

1976 births
Canoeists at the 1996 Summer Olympics
Canoeists at the 2000 Summer Olympics
Croatian male canoeists
Living people
Olympic canoeists of Croatia
Sportspeople from Zagreb
20th-century Croatian people